Colonel (rtd) Yohanna Dickson (28 December 1950 – 14 July 2015) was Administrator of Taraba State, Nigeria from December 1993 to August 1996 during the military regime of General Sani Abacha.

In April 2001, Yohanna was named a member of the steering committee of the newly formed United Nigeria Development Forum (UNDF), a political group headed by several former military governors. In the April 2003 elections, Dickson was an unsuccessful candidate running on the United Nigeria People's Party (UNPP) platform for the Kaduna South senatorial seat.

Dickson challenged the result, saying the winner, Isaiah Balat of the People's Democratic Party (PDP), was not qualified to run for election.

Dickson later transferred to the PDP. In January 2009 he was appointed chairman of a seven-member disciplinary committee of the Kaduna State PDP chapter. He was appointed chairman of the Kaduna State Water Board. In August 2009, while inspecting a new water supply in the Zaria Regional Water Supply Scheme, Dickson said that the state would deal severely with contractors who failed to deliver on schedule and according to specifications. 

Dickson died on 14 July 2015, aged 64, in Kaduna State, Nigeria.

Bibliography

References

2015 deaths
1950 births
Governors of Taraba State
Nigerian activists